Municipio I is an administrative subdivision of the municipality of Rome, encompassing the centre of the city.

It was first created by Rome's city council on 19 January 2001 and has a president who is elected during the mayoral elections. On 11 March 2013 its borders were modified and it was expanded with the incorporation of part of the abolished Municipio XVII. Since then all the rioni of Rome, which are the city's historic districts, form part of Municipio I together with the localities Delle Vittorie and Eroi.

Subdivision
Municipio I is divided into 11 localities:

Rioni

Since 2013 the territory includes all 22 rioni:
R.I Monti, R.II Trevi, R.III Colonna, R.IV Campo Marzio, R.V Ponte, R.VI Parione, R.VII Regola, R.VIII Sant'Eustachio, R.IX Pigna, R.X Campitelli, R.XI Sant'Angelo, R.XII Ripa, R.XIII Trastevere, R.XIV Borgo, R.XV Esquilino, R.XVI Ludovisi, R.XVII Sallustiano, R.XVIII Castro Pretorio, R.XIX Celio, R.XX Testaccio, R.XXI San Saba and R.XXII Prati.

Municipal Government

The president of the municipio is directly elected by citizens. The Council of the municipio is elected every five years, with a system under which voters express a direct choice for the President or an indirect choice voting for the party of the candidate's coalition. If no candidate receives at least 50% of votes, the top two candidates go to a second round after two weeks. This gives a result whereby the winning candidate may be able to claim majority support.

Last election occurred on 5 and 19 June 2016:

The table below shows the current composition of the council:

Here is a list of presidents of the municipio since the office was created in 2001:

Geography 
The area of the municipality occupies the central districts of the town, including the whole historic district enclosed by the Aurelian Walls and the Janiculum walls and crossed by the Tiber, which makes part of UNESCO's List of World Heritage Sites. The quarters built over the river in the late 19th century and the beginning of 20th century between Vatican Hill and Monte Mario (Prati, Trionfale, Della Vittoria) are also within its borders.

The ancient core of the municipality is the historic seven hills (Palatine, Aventine, Capitolium, Quirinal, Viminal, Esquiline and Caelian), as well as the Janiculum, the Pincian Hill and the artificial hillocks of Monte Testaccio and Monte Giordano. Along the Tiber rises the Tiber Island.

Culture

Libraries 
 Enzo Tortora (Via Zabaglia)
 Rispoli (Piazza Grazioli)
 Giordano Bruno (Via Giordano Bruno)
 Centrale Ragazzi (Via San Paolo alla Regola)
 Romana Sarti (Piazza dell'Accademia di San Luca)
 Casa della Memoria e della Storia (Via San Francesco di Sales)
 Casa delle Traduzioni (Via degli Avignonesi)
 Library of the Scuola popolare di musica di Testaccio (Piazza Orazio Giustiniani)

Museums 
The municipio hosts 103 museums (70 municipal museums and 33 State museums), such as the Vittoriano, the Capitoline Museums, the Scuderie del Quirinale, the Palazzo delle Esposizioni and the Museo Alfonso Gallo

Cinemas 

 Teatro Adriano (Piazza Cavour). An old theater transformed into a movie theater.
 Cinema Alcazar (Via Merry del Val). Closed since January 2016
 Cinema America. Closed since 1998, it was re-opened on November 13, 2012, and cleared on 3 September 2014.
 Cinema Augustus (Corso Vittorio Emanuele II)
 Cinema Barberini (Piazza Barberini)
 Cinema Doria (Via Andrea Doria)
 Cinema Farnese (Piazza Campo de' Fiori)
 Cinema Fiamma (Via Bissolati)
 Cinema Filmstudio (Via degli orti D'Alibert)
 Cinema Giulio Cesare (Viale Giulio Cesare)
 Cinema Greenwich (Via Giovanni Battista Bodoni)
 Cinema Intrastevere(Vicolo Moroni)
 Cinema Metropolitan (Via del Corso). Closed in 2010.

 Cinema Nuovo Olimpia (Via in Lucina)
 Cinema Nuovo Sacher (Largo Ascianghi)
 Cinema Quattro Fontane (Via delle Quattro Fontane)
 Cinema Quirinale (Via Nazionale). Closed.
 Cinema Reale (Piazza Sidney Sonnino)
 Cinema Rivoli (Via Lombardia)
 Cinema Roma (Piazza Sidney Sonnino). Closed since 2002.
 Cinema Royal (Via Emanuele Filiberto)
 Sala Troisi (Via Girolamo Induno). Formerly Cinema Induno, is closed since 2013.
 Warner Village Cinema Moderno (Piazza della Repubblica).

Theatres 

 Teatro Ambra Jovinelli, su via Guglielmo Pepe
 Teatro Anfitrione (Via di S. Saba)
 Teatro Argentina (Largo di Torre Argentina)
 Teatro Belli (Piazza di Sant'Apollonia)
 Teatro Brancaccio (Via Merulana)
 Teatro Centrale Roma (Via Celsa)
 Teatro Eliseo (Via Nazionale)
 Teatro Petrolini (Via Rubattino)

 Teatro Piccolo Jovinelli (Via Giovanni Giolitti)
 Teatro Quirino (Via delle Vergini)
 Teatro Rossini (Piazza S.Chiara)
 Teatro Sala Umberto (Via della Mercede)
 Teatro Sistina (Via Sistina)
 Teatro Valle (Via del Teatro Valle)
 Teatro Vittoria (Piazza di Santa Maria Liberatrice)

Transport
Stations of Rome Metro in the Municipio:
 Cipro, Ottaviano, Lepanto, Flaminio, Spagna, Barberini, Repubblica, Termini, Vittorio Emanuele, Manzoni, San Giovanni;
 Castro Pretorio, Termini, Cavour, Colosseo, Circo Massimo, Piramide;
 San Giovanni.
The public transport is ensured by numerous access points to the rail lines, as well as many bus, trolleybuses and trams (line 8 towards Gianicolense and lines 5 and 14 towards Via Prenestina).

In this Municipio, or at its borders, there is Roma Termini railway station (the main railway yard in the town, with regional, national and international connections, among which the Rome–Naples high-speed railway), the Roma Ostiense railway station, the central sections of the Line A and Line B of the Metro (with interchange at Roma Termini) and the terminus of the three regional railways Rome-Lido, Rome North and Rome-Giardinetti. Roma Trastevere and Roma San Pietro railway stations are also very close and easily accessible.

Roma Termini has a direct rail link with Fiumicino Airport, served by the Leonardo Express, as well as many bus lines both to Fiumicino and Ciampino Airports.

References

External links 
 

 
Municipi of Rome